John Murphy (–2009) was a Gaelic footballer who played for the Derry county team. He was part of the first Derry side to win the National Football League.

Murphy played club football for Seán O'Leary's and won the Derry Senior Football Championship with the club.

Personal life
Murphy was originally from Newbridge. He was principal of St Pius X College, Magherafelt. He was married with four children. He died in August 2009 aged 83 and was buried in St Patrick's Church at Glen, Maghera.

Playing career
John Murphy played club football for Seán O'Leary's GAC Newbridge, and won Derry Championship medals with the club.

Murphy was right half-back when Derry won the county's first National Football League title in 1947, defeating Clare in the final at Croke Park. It was also the county's first ever national title.

He played for Ulster in 1950. Having played in the Railway Cup semi-final, he missed the final through injury. Ulster won the final, but Murphy did not receive a winners' medal at the time, but was presented with his medal 58 years later in 2008.

Honours

Inter-county
National Football League (1): 1947

Province
Railway Cup (1): 1950

References

1920s births
2009 deaths
Derry inter-county Gaelic footballers
Heads of schools in Ireland
Newbridge Gaelic footballers
Ulster inter-provincial Gaelic footballers